Mordechai Yosef Leiner of Izbica (מרדכי יוסף ליינר) known as "the Ishbitzer" ( Izhbitze, Izbitse, Ishbitze) (1801-1854) was a rabbinic Hasidic thinker and founder of the Izhbitza-Radzyn dynasty of Hasidic Judaism.  He is best known for his work Mei Hashiloach.

Biography
Rabbi Mordechai Yosef was born in Tomashov in 1801 to his father Reb Yaakov the son of Reb Mordechai of Sekul, a descendant of Rabbi Saul Wahl. At the age of two he became orphaned of his father. He became a disciple of Reb Simcha Bunim of Peshischa where he joined Rabbi Menachem Mendel of Kotzk and Rabbi Yosef of Yartshev; both were also born in Tomashov. When Rabbi Menachem Mendel became Rebbe in Kotzk, Reb Mordechai Yosef became his disciple there; then in 1839 became himself a rebbe in Tomaszów, moving subsequently to Izbica.

His leading disciple was Rabbi Yehuda Leib Eiger (1816-1888), grandson of Rabbi Akiva Eiger. His students included Rabbi Zadok HaKohen of Lublin (1823–1900), his son, Rabbi Yaakov Leiner (1828–1878) and his grandson Rabbi Gershon Henoch Leiner of Radzyn.

Mordechai Yosef Leiner is buried in an ohel in the Jewish cemetery in Izbica.

Relationship with the Kotzker Rebbe 
Rabbi Leiner was the right-hand man of the Kotzker rebbe, Rabbi Menachem Mendel of Kotzk, by whom he was charged with overseeing the Hasidim. In 1840 Leiner had a public and dramatic falling out with the Kotzker Rebbe. On the day after Simchat Torah of that year, Leiner left Kotzk with many of his followers to form his own hasidic circle. The reasons given for the break are varied.

Thought 
Rabbi Leiner is best known for his work Mei Hashiloach ("מי השילוח") a popular collection of his teachings on the weekly Torah portion and Jewish holidays, published by his grandson, Rabbi Gershon Leiner, and usually printed in 2 volumes.
It has twice been translated into English. 
 

The work was however controversial; attempts were even made to sabotage the press on which it was being printed. 
In particular R. Leiner's view regarding Free will was at serious odds with the standard Jewish view. 

Here R. Leiner expressed the doctrine that all events, including human actions, are absolutely under God's control, or as Rabbinic discourse would phrase it, by "hashgacha pratis." 
Thus, if everything is determined by God, then even sin is done in accordance with God's will. 
He presents defenses of various Biblical sins, such as Korach's rebellion, Zimri during the Heresy of Peor, and Judah's incident with Tamar.

One of his most cited comments is on Leviticus 21:1 "None shall defile himself for any [dead] person among his kin." Rabbi Leiner read the verse as a warning against the defilement of the soul. The soul is defiled when it is infected with the bitterness and rage that comes with senseless suffering and tragedy. Those who — like the Kohanim— would serve God, are commanded to find the resources to resist the defilements of despair and darkness. Despair is the ultimate denial of God, and surrender to darkness is the ultimate blasphemy.

Influence 
His thought influenced (mostly indirectly, through the work of Leiner's student, Reb Tzadok Hakohen) the mussar of Rabbi Isaac Hutner and Rabbi Moshe Wolfson.
Leiner's thought continued to have influence in the twentieth century, especially on Neo-Hasidism, and the teachings of Rabbi Shlomo Carlebach (the "singing rabbi").

Rabbi Shlomo Carlebach is credited with the recent popularization of Rabbi Leiner's teachings. He apparently came across Rabbi Leiner's work in an old Jewish book store. He is quoted as saying that after initially being perplexed as to the peculiar nature of the teachings he quickly realized that in it lay the "secret for turning Jews on to the deeper meanings of Judaism".

Bibliography 
Alan Brill, Thinking God: The Mysticism of Rabbi Zadok HaKohen Of Lublin (Yeshiva University Press, Ktav 2002)
Morris M. Faierstein, All is in the Hands of Heaven: The Teachings of Rabbi Mordecai Joseph Leiner of Izbica (New York: Ktav, 1989) (2nd revised edition, Gorgias Press, 2005)
Shaul Magid, Hasidism on the Margin (University of Wisc. 2003)
Allan Nadler, "Hasidism on the Margin: Reconciliation, Antinomianism, and Messianism in Izbica/Radzin Hasidism (review)" Jewish Quarterly Review - Volume 96, Number 2, Spring 2006, pp. 276–282
Rivka Schatz, "Autonomy of the Spirit and the Law of Moses" (Hebrew), Molad 21 (1973–1974), pp. 554–561
Joseph Weiss, "A Late Jewish Utopia of Religious Freedom," in David Goldstein, ed., Studies in Eastern European Jewish Mysticism (Oxford: Oxford University Press, 1985)
Jonatan Meir, "The Status of Commandments in the Philosophy of Rabbi Mordechai Joseph Leiner of Izbica’, Mishlav 35 (2000), pp. 27-53
Herzl Hefter, "In God's Hands: the Religious Phenomenology of R. Mordechai Yosef of Ishbitz", Tradition 46:1(2013), pp. 43–65.

Notes

References

External links 
 Mei Hashiloach: A Hebrew-English Translation of the Hasidic Commentary on the Torah by the Ishbitzer Rebbe by J. Hershy Worch
 Mei HaSiloach 
 
 Lectures

Rebbes of Izhbitza–Radzin
Polish Hasidic rabbis
Hasidic rabbis in Europe
Determinists
19th-century Polish rabbis
19th-century Jewish theologians
Philosophers of Judaism
Jewish philosophers
People from Tomaszów Lubelski
1801 births
1854 deaths